The Aga Khan University Hospital (AKUH) in Karachi, established in 1985, is the primary teaching site of the Aga Khan University's (AKU) Faculty of Health Sciences. Founded by the Aga Khan, the hospital provides a broad range of secondary and tertiary care, including diagnosis of disease and team management of patient care. 

Aga Khan University is Pakistan's largest private medical institute and hospital.

Facilities
Aga Khan University Hospital (AKUH) has 560 beds in operation and its in-patients have the region's lowest average length of stay of 4.0 days. The hospital is equipped to diagnose and treat medical (including cardiac), surgical, obstetric and gynecology, pediatrics and psychiatry patients. A total of 560 beds, 122 private and 117 semi-private air-conditioned rooms, 251 General Ward beds and 52 special care beds are available in ICU, CCU and NICU. The hospital has 17 main operating theatres. In addition to these, there are 4 operating theatres in Surgical Day Care and 2 in Obs/Gyn. Day Care Surgeries are performed at AKUH.
Pharmacy, Radiology (including nuclear medicine), Laboratory, Cardiopulmonary, Neurophysiology and Physiological Measurement services are available at AKUH. AKUH Laboratory operates 47 phlebotomy or specimen collection centers in Karachi and in all major cities of Pakistan.
A new private wing was added to the hospital. The construction was completed in 2020.

Architecture
The Aga Khan Medical Complex, built on a 65-acre site in Karachi, was planned and designed by Payette Associates, a Boston, U.S.-based architectural firm. It consists of a 721-bed hospital, a medical school for 500 students, a school of nursing, housing for staff and students, and a mosque. The building has been carefully designed to take into account the history, climate, environment, symbolism and the spiritual values of the Muslim culture.

Accreditation
Aga Khan University Hospital, Karachi is a Joint Commission International (JCI) accredited hospital.

This hospital is also accredited by the College of Physicians and Surgeons of Pakistan.

Cooperation with other Karachi hospitals
In 2017, a joint board was set up to conduct a study of all major hospitals in Karachi under the Karachi Municipal Corporation (KMC) and the Aga Khan University Hospital to try to help upgrade all of KMC-affiliated medical facilities in Karachi.

Aga Khan University Hospital is among the leaders in Pakistan in introducing new healthcare technology. In 2016, The Express Tribune (newspaper) reported, "The Aga Khan University Hospital has become the first medical centre to introduce the new advanced brain surgery technology, Neuro-Robotic Exoscope, in Pakistan."

See also
Aga Khan Development Network
Aga Khan University
Aga Khan Hospital Jobs & Careers

References

Hospital buildings completed in 1985
Karachi
Hospitals in Karachi
Teaching hospitals in Pakistan
Hospitals established in 1985
Aga Khan University
1985 establishments in Pakistan